Collected may refer to:

 Collected (Black 'n Blue album), 2005
 Collected (Demis Roussos album), 2015
 Collected (Joe Jackson album), 2010
 Collected (k-os album), 2007
 Collected (Limp Bizkit album), 2008
 Collected (Massive Attack album), 2006
 Collected, an album by Mary Black, 1984
 Collected: 1996–2005, an album by the Wallflowers, 2009

See also 
 Collected Poems (disambiguation)
 Collected Stories (disambiguation)
 Collected works (disambiguation)
 Collecting
 Collection (disambiguation)